Latarcins are short antimicrobial peptides from the venom of the spider Lachesana tarabaevi. Latarcins adopt an amphipathic alpha-helical structure in the plasma membrane. Possible pharmacological applications for latarcins include antimicrobial and anticancer treatments.

References

Protein families
Antimicrobial peptides
Spider toxins